FPD  may rafer to:

US police departments 
 Ferguson Police Department (Missouri)
 Frederick City Police Department (Maryland)
 Fresno Police Department, California
 Fowler Police Department, Colorado

Other uses 
 Democratic People's Federation (Spanish )
 First Presbyterian Day School, in Macon, Georgia, United States
 Flame-photometric detector
 Flat panel detector
 Flat panel display
 Freezing-point depression
 Liga FPD (Costa Rican top-level football league)